Danilo dos Santos de Oliveira (born 19 April 2001), known simply as Danilo or Danilo Oliveira, is a Brazilian professional footballer who plays as a midfielder for Premier League club Nottingham Forest.

Born in Salvador, he was in the youth academy of Bahia, before stints at Jacuipense and PFC Cajazeiras, where he was spotted by Palmeiras in 2018. After progressing steadily in Palmeiras' youth ranks, he made his first team Série A debut in 2020 at the age of 19. He was part of the Palmeiras teams who won the Libertadores consecutively in 2020 and 2021, solidifying himself as a stalwart in the middle of the park and becoming a consistent first-team starter.

He was named in the Campeonato Paulista Team of the Year in 2022.

Club career

Early career
Born in Salvador, Bahia, Danilo represented Bahia as a youth before being released by the club. In 2017, at the age of 16, he joined PFC Cajazeiras through a social project, after a short stint at Jacuipense.

Palmeiras
In 2018, Danilo joined Palmeiras, initially for the under-17s. He progressed through the youth setup, being later a starter for the under-20s before making his first team – and Série A – debut on 6 September 2020, replacing fellow youth graduate Patrick de Paula in a 2–1 away win against Red Bull Bragantino.

On 10 September 2020, Danilo was bought outright by Verdão, signing a permanent five-year contract with the club. He scored his first professional goal on 2 December, netting his team's fifth in a 5–0 Copa Libertadores home routing of Delfín SC.

Nottingham Forest
In January 2023, Danilo joined Premier League side Nottingham Forest for an estimated £16 million fee, signing a six-and a-half-year deal with the English club in the process.

Career statistics

Honours
Palmeiras
Copa Libertadores: 2020, 2021
Campeonato Brasileiro: 2022
Copa do Brasil: 2020
Recopa Sudamericana: 2022
Campeonato Paulista: 2022
Individual
FIFA Club World Cup Bronze Ball: 2021
Campeonato Paulista Team of the Year: 2022

References

External links

Profile at the Nottingham Forest F.C. website

2001 births
Living people
Sportspeople from Salvador, Bahia
Brazilian footballers
Association football midfielders
Campeonato Brasileiro Série A players
Copa Libertadores-winning players
Sociedade Esportiva Palmeiras players
Nottingham Forest F.C. players
Premier League players
Brazilian expatriate footballers
Brazilian expatriate sportspeople in England
Expatriate footballers in England